Blackhawk is an unincorporated community in Carroll County, Illinois, United States. Balckhawk is located near Illinois Route 84, north of Savanna.

References

Unincorporated communities in Carroll County, Illinois
Unincorporated communities in Illinois